Méishān (lit. Méi Hill) is the romanization of Chinese names 眉山, 梅山 or 煤山. It might refer to:

Administrative district
Meishan, Sichuan
 Meishan, Nanjing, an area in Nanjing city, which formerly administrated by Shanghai city as exclave
  
 , an island of Ningbo, Zhejiang
 
  in Fujian.
  in Ruzhou, Henan.
 Meishan Township, Chiayi in Taiwan

Mountain
 Meishan, Hunan, notable for being invaded by the Song dynasty 
 Jingshan, also known as Meishan, a hill and a park in Beijing
 Meishan, Chengdu, a hill in Chengdu city, now demolished.

See also
 Meishan Iron and Steel, a steel company based in Meishan, Nanjing
 Meishan pig, a pig breed named after Meishan, Nanjing

References